Hjalmar Rued Holand (October 20, 1872 – August 6, 1963) was a Norwegian-American historian and author. He was the author of a number of books and articles principally dealing with the history of Door County, Wisconsin, of the Upper Midwest and with Norwegian-American immigration.

Background
Hjalmar Rued Holand was born in Høland, Akershus, Norway. Holand, at age 13, along with his older sister, Helene, immigrated to America to stay with an older brother and his wife, living in Chicago. Unhappy with the living arrangements, Holand left Chicago to stay with another sister, Annette Johnson, living in Wautoma, Wisconsin. He received his BA from the University of Wisconsin in 1898, earning his MA the following year.  Holand was awarded a Guggenheim Fellowship in Anthropology & Cultural Studies during 1950.

Career
Holand lived most of his life on a farm near Ephraim, Wisconsin. Holand was an early advocate of the now widely recognized realization that Vikings visited the New World in voyages which pre-dated Christopher Columbus. Holand also made an effort to confirm the authenticity of the Kensington Stone together with other rune stones and Viking relics found throughout North America. Holland also wrote a two volume history of Door County, Wisconsin, which was published in 1917. Holand founded and was the long-time president of the Door County Historical Society.

Holand is most frequently associated with his two volume history of Norwegian-American immigration. Holand spent many years collecting the stories as he traveled to various Norwegian-American settlements in the Upper Midwest.  The results were De Norske Settlements Historie released in 1908 and Den Siste Folkevandring Sagastubber Fra Nybyggerlivet I Amerika published in 1930.  Both were written and published in Norwegian. These works have subsequently been translated and published in the English language.  The first was a partial translation released in 1978 and the second a complete translation released during 2006.

Selected bibliography
De Norske Settlements Historie (1908)  - (published in English as Norwegians in America in 1978)
Nils Otto Tank (1909)
History of Door County, Wisconsin (1917)
Old Peninsula Days (1925)
Coon Prairie (1927)
Coon Valley (1928)
Den Siste Folkevandring Sagastubber Fra Nybyggerlivet I Amerika (1930) – (published in English under the title History of the Norwegian Settlements in 2006)
Wisconsin’s Belgium Community (1931)
The Kensington Stone (Wisconsin: Ephraim, 1932)
Westward from Vinland (1940)
My First Eighty Years (1957)
Explorations in America before Columbus (1956)
A Pre-Columbian Crusade to America (1962)

See also
Viking revival
Norway Lutheran Church
Simon Kahquados (1851 – 1930), Potawatomi leader and historical source for Holand

References

Other sources
 Burton, Paul and Frances Ephraim Stories (Ephraim: Stonehill Publishing, published in 1999. reprinted in 2003)
H. Holand, Noted Author and Historian, Dead at 90 ("Door County Advocate". August 8, 1963, pp. 1 and 3)

External links
. Sons of Norway. Hjalmar R. Holand Lodge

1872 births
1963 deaths
University of Wisconsin–Madison alumni
People from Door County, Wisconsin
Norwegian emigrants to the United States
People from Wautoma, Wisconsin